Aw Chu Kin (Chinese: 胡子钦  ? – 1908 in Rangoon, British Raj) was a Burmese Chinese herbalist. He is best known as the original inventor of Tiger Balm.

Aw's father was a Chinese herbology practitioner in Xiamen and a Hakka Chinese with ancestry in Yongding County. Being of a poor background, Aw first immigrated to Singapore where he stayed at the kongsi of his clan. He then moved to Penang and started to work as a practitioner of Traditional Chinese medicine, known as a sinseh in Penang Hokkien. Afterwards, he moved to Rangoon where, with the help of his uncle, founded his apothecary named Eng Aun Tong in 1870.

Aw Chu-Kin got married in Rangoon. He had three sons, the eldest of whom, Boon-Leng (Gentle/Refined Dragon) died young. He was survived by his two sons, Boon-Haw (Gentle/Refined Tiger) and Boon-Par (Gentle/Refined Leopard). In 1892, Aw sent Boon-Haw to his grandfather's village to be instructed in traditional Chinese methods while Boon-Par stayed in Rangoon to receive British education. He left his business to younger son Boon-Par who then called his elder brother to run Eng Aun Tong together.

References

Our Heritage Haw Par Corporation website
The Power of the Tiger Clarence Y K Ngui, Malaysian Business, 1 July 2003
Hong Kong apothecary: a visual history of Chinese medicine packaging Simon Go, Princeton Architectural Press, 2003
胡文虎父女的汕頭緣

1908 deaths
Burmese people of Chinese descent
People from Xiamen
Chinese emigrants to Malaysia
Chinese emigrants to Singapore
Chinese emigrants to Myanmar
Aw family
Year of birth missing